The Norwich School of painters was the first provincial art movement established in Britain, active in the early 19th century. Artists of the school were inspired by the natural environment of the Norfolk landscape and owed some influence to the work of landscape painters of the Dutch Golden Age such as Hobbema and Ruisdael.

History

The Norwich Society of Artists was founded in 1803 by John Crome and Robert Ladbrooke as a club where artists could meet to exchange ideas. Its aims were "an enquiry into the rise, progress and present state of painting, architecture, and sculpture, with a view to point out the best methods of study to attain the greater perfection in these arts." The society's first meeting was in "The Hole in the Wall" tavern; two years later it moved to premises which allowed it to offer members work and exhibition space. Its first exhibition opened in 1805, and was such a success that it became an annual event until 1825. The building was demolished but the society re-opened three years later, in 1828, as "The Norfolk and Suffolk Institution for the Promotion of the Fine Arts" at a different venue and exhibitions continued until 1833.<ref>Holme, Geoffrey (Ed.). The Norwich School (The Studio Ltd., 1920). p. 1.</ref>

The leading light of the movement was John Crome who attracted many friends and pupils until his death in 1821. The mantle of leadership then fell on John Sell Cotman, a member of the society since 1807, who continued to keep the society together until he left Norwich for London in 1834. The society effectively ceased to exist from that date.

The Norwich School's great achievement was that a small group of self-taught working class artists were able to paint with vitality the hinterland surrounding Norwich, assisted by meagre local patronage. Far from creating pastiches of the Dutch 17th century, Crome and Cotman, along with Joseph Stannard, established a school of landscape painting which deserves greater fame; the broad washes of J.S. Cotman's water-colours anticipate French impressionism.

One reason the Norwich School artists are not so well known as other painters of the period, notably Constable and Turner, is because the majority of their canvases were collected by the industrialist J. J. Colman (of Colman's mustard fame), and have been on permanent display in Norwich Castle Museum since the 1880s. This lack of wider exposure was remedied in 2001, when many of the school's major works were exhibited outside Norwich for the first time at the Tate Gallery, London in 2000.

Gallery

Members and associates

Henry Bright
James Bulwer
Joseph Clover
Samuel David Colkett and Victoria Susannah Colkett
Edwin Cooper
Daniel Coppin
Frederick George Cotman
John Joseph Cotman
John Sell Cotman 
Miles Edmund Cotman
John Crome ("Old Crome")
John Berney Crome ("Young Crome")
Edward Thomas Daniell
Robert Dixon
William Philip Barnes Freeman
Joseph Geldart
Charles Hodgson
David Hodgson
John Cantiloe Joy and William Joy
Frederick Ladbrooke
John Berney Ladbrooke
Robert Ladbrooke
Robert Leman
Thomas Lound
Horace Beevor Love
Maria Margitson
John Middleton
Henry Ninham
John Ninham
Alfred Priest
Anthony Sandys
Frederick Sandys
Obadiah Short
James Sillett
Alfred Stannard
Alfred George Stannard
Eloise Harriet Stannard
Emily Stannard (Emily Coppin)
Joseph Stannard
Arthur James Stark
James Stark
John Thirtle
George Vincent

References

Further reading

 
 
 
 
 

External links
 
The Norwich School (Andrew Graham Dixon, Sunday Telegraph'' features)
Norfolk Museums service

1803 establishments in England
Culture in Norfolk
History of Norfolk
British art movements
English art